Soğukgöze can refer to:

 Soğukgöze, Bayburt
 Soğukgöze, Olur